Qaratil is a village in Hamdan District of Sanaa Governorate, Yemen. It is located a bit to the south of the road between Sanaa and Shibam Kawkaban.

History 
The earliest known historical mention of Qaratil is in the Ghayat al-amani of Yahya ibn al-Husayn, in connection with the events of the year 1056 (448 AH)

References 

Villages in Sanaa Governorate